Ellie Kildunne (born 8 September 1999) is an English rugby union player. She is a member of the England women's national rugby union team and plays for Harlequins Women at club level.

International career
Kildunne's England debut came in 2017, when she scored a try for the England 15s in a match against Canada.

After an impressive performance in the Tyrrells Premier 15s, she was called up to start five of England's 2018 Women's Six Nations Championship matches. She was named Player of the Match after England's win over Ireland.

In the summer of 2018, Kildunne transitioned to England Women's Sevens team as it fought to - and did - qualify for the 2020 Summer Olympics.

Kildunne made her return to XVs rugby but missed the first two events of the 2019 World Series due to injury. She went on to play eight of England's matches of the competition and scored three tries for her country.

She was part of the team that won the 2020 Women's Six Nations Championship, which was postponed until late 2020 due to the Covid-19 pandemic. She also played in the 2021 Women's Six Nations Championships, which England won. She was named in the England squad for the delayed 2021 Rugby World Cup held in New Zealand in October and November 2022.

Club career 
Kildunne began playing rugby league for Keighley Albion and rugby union for Keighley RUFC before moving on to West Park, Leeds, and then Castleford. She joined Premier 15s team Gloucester-Hartpury for the 2017/18 season.

She signed for Wasps in September 2020.

Early life and education 
Kildunne grew up in West Yorkshire and started playing rugby aged seven. She played rugby league for Keighley Albion as well as rugby union for Keighley RUFC, where she was the only girl on the pitch.

She was also a keen footballer, but went down the rugby route when she enrolled at Hartpury College after finishing school.

At Under 18 level, Kildunne captained the Yorkshire team and represented the England Under 18 side at sevens.

References

1999 births
Living people
England women's international rugby union players
English female rugby league players
English female rugby union players
Rugby league players from Yorkshire
Rugby union players from Yorkshire